United to Advance (Els Units) is a Catalan centrist and christian democratic political party founded in June 2017 by former members of the defunct Democratic Union of Catalonia (UDC) and non-independentist catalan nationalists. The party defines itself as moderate Catalan nationalist and opposes Catalan independence.

History
The party, promoted by former members of the extinct Democratic Union of Catalonia (UDC), was publicly presented in Barcelona on 19 June 2017. In its founding congress held in October 2017, the party proposed forming an electoral platform together with the Socialists' Party of Catalonia (PSC) and other actors from moderate catalanism opposed to Catalan independence.

Units reached an electoral agreement with the PSC ahead of the 2017 Catalan regional election, under which party leader Ramon Espadaler would run as the list's third candidate for the Barcelona constituency. After the election, the party joined PSC's parliamentary group. The party renewed their alliance with the PSC for of the upcoming 2019 Spanish local elections. Concurrently, it joined the Coalition for a Solidary Europe alliance together with the Basque Nationalist Party (PNV), Canarian Coalition (CCa) and other regionalist political parties in Spain ahead of the 2019 European Parliament election.

As of March 2020, the party was in talks for an electoral alliance ahead of the 2021 Catalan regional election with "The Country of Tomorrow" think tank, which had split with the Catalan European Democratic Party (PDeCAT) in September 2019. After the latter established the Nationalist Party of Catalonia (PNC), both Els Units and the PNC did not rule out any prospective alliance.

Electoral performance

Parliament of Catalonia

Notes

References

2017 establishments in Catalonia
Political parties established in 2017
Catalan nationalist parties
Political parties in Catalonia
Centrist parties in Spain